Andrew Reynolds is an English archaeologist specialising in the study of medieval Britain. He is a lecturer at the Institute of Archaeology, University College London. Reynolds worked as a field archaeologist from 1985 to 1990 before going on to gain a BA in Medieval Archaeology and a PhD from University College London.

One of his projects examined the medieval use of the Neolithic monument of Avebury in Wiltshire.

Publications

Books
Reynolds, Andrew (2002). Later Anglo-Saxon England: Life and Landscape. The History Press.
Reynolds, Andrew (2009). Anglo-Saxon Deviant Burial Customs. Oxford and New York: Oxford University Press.

Edited books
Griffiths, David; Reynolds, Andrew and Semple, Sarah (editors) (2003). Anglo-Saxon Studies in Archaeology and History: Boundaries in Early Medieval Britain v. 12. Oxford University School of Archaeology.

References

English archaeologists
Living people
Anglo-Saxon studies scholars
Alumni of University College London
Academics of University College London
People associated with the UCL Institute of Archaeology
Year of birth missing (living people)
Medieval archaeologists